XHCMN-FM is a radio station on 98.9 FM in Ciudad del Carmen, Campeche. The station is owned by Radio S.A. and carries its Máxima pop format.

History
XHCMN was the first FM radio station in Ciudad del Carmen, awarded to Olga Rosa Bolaños López on August 27, 1991. It was sold to its current concessionaire in 1999.

References

Radio stations in Campeche
Mexican radio stations with expired concessions